Daniel Waldo (1762–1864), veteran of the American Revolutionary War, later missionary and U.S. House clergy.

Daniel Waldo may also refer to:
Daniel Waldo (Massachusetts politician), delegate to the Hartford Convention
Daniel Waldo (Oregon pioneer) (1800–1880), pioneer in Oregon, United States